Donacoscaptes fulvescens is a moth in the family Crambidae. It is found in Peru.

The wingspan is about 40 mm. The forewings are pale ochraceous buff with scattered large black scales and vinaceous-fawn shading in the cell. There is a black point at the end of the cell and a number of small terminal black points, as well as a faint brownish postmedial line. The hindwings are suffused with smoky olive grey. The costa and postmedial space are whitish.

References

Haimbachiini
Moths described in 1919